Misaki Ozawa (born 8 August 1985) is a Japanese former field hockey player who competed in the 2008 Summer Olympics.

References

External links
 

1985 births
Living people
Japanese female field hockey players
Olympic field hockey players of Japan
Field hockey players at the 2008 Summer Olympics
Asian Games medalists in field hockey
Field hockey players at the 2006 Asian Games
Asian Games silver medalists for Japan
Medalists at the 2006 Asian Games